Ani Amiraghyan (born 9 October 1993) is an Armenian tennis player.

Amiraghyan has won one singles title and six doubles titles on the ITF Circuit. On 12 August 2013, she reached her best singles ranking of world No. 422. On 27 June 2016, she peaked at No. 505 in the doubles rankings.

Playing for Armenia Fed Cup team, Amiraghyan has a win–loss record of 29–20 as of July 2022.

ITF finals

Singles: 9 (1 title, 8 runner–ups)

Doubles: 13 (6 titles, 7 runner-ups)

References

External links
 
 
 
 

1993 births
Living people
Sportspeople from Yerevan
Armenian female tennis players